The 2011 French Athletics Championships was the 123rd edition of the national championship in outdoor track and field for France. It was held on 28–30 July at the Stadium Municipal d'Albi in Albi. A total of 38 events (divided evenly between the sexes) were contested over the three-day competition. Christophe Lemaitre broke the French record in the men's 100 metres with a time of 9.92 seconds.

Results

Men

Women

References

Results
 Results. Fédération française d'athlétisme 

French Athletics Championships
French Athletics Championships
French Athletics Championships
French Athletics Championships
Sport in Albi